Turbonilla maestratii is a species of sea snail, a marine gastropod mollusk in the family Pyramidellidae, the pyrams and their allies.

Description
The shell grows to a length of 5.3 mm

Distribution
This species occurs in the Atlantic Ocean off Brazil at depths between 45 m and 50m.

References

External links
 Pimenta A.D. & Absalão R.S. (2004). Fifteen new species and ten new records of Turbonilla Risso, 1826 (Gastropoda, Heterobranchia, Pyramidellidae) from Brazil. Bollettino Malacologico. 39 (5-8): 113-140
 To Encyclopedia of Life
 To World Register of Marine Species

maestratii
Gastropods described in 2004